VRTX may refer to:

 Versatile Real-Time Executive, a real-time operating system
 Vertex Pharmaceuticals (Nasdaq stock symbol)
 PowerEdge VRTX, a computer hardware product line from Dell